The Agricultural Promotion & Investment Corporation of Odisha Limited or APICOL is a Government of Odisha Public Sector Undertaking incorporated on 1 March 1996 with the intention of bringing enterprise into agriculture as envisaged in State Agriculture Policy 1996. It started functioning since 1 June 1996 with the sole objective of promoting agro-based industries/food processing industries including commercial agriculture/horticulture/animal husbandry/fisheries, in broad terms to promote investment in agriculture and allied sector.

Subsidiaries
Capital Investment Subsidy (CIS) for Commercial Agri Enterprises (CAE) and Agro Service Centers (ASC)

External links
Official Website of Agricultural Promotion and Investment Corporation Of Odisha Limited (APICOL)

Economy of Odisha
State agencies of Odisha
Agricultural organisations based in India
1996 establishments in Orissa
Indian companies established in 1996